Dynamic balance is the branch of mechanics that is concerned with the effects of forces on the motion of a body or system of bodies, especially of forces that do not originate within the system itself, which is also called kinetics.

Dynamic balance is the ability of an object to balance while in motion or switching between positions.

References

Mechanics